Upland game bird is an American term which refers to non-water fowl game birds in groundcover-rich terrestrial ecosystems above wetlands and riparian zones (i.e. "uplands"), which are commonly hunted with gun dogs (pointing breeds, flushing spaniels and retrievers).

United States

As of 2013 the population of upland game birds such as pheasants had been falling in agricultural states such as Iowa where increased commodity prices for crops such as corn had resulted in reductions in game habitat in acreage set aside in the Conservation Reserve Program. A significant reduction in the number of hunters over the previous 20 years was also reported.

State laws
At least ten states have passed laws wherein there is a definition of "upland game" giving a list of species. These lists are not at all the same, and some of them contain non-avian species. These species are always listed by common name instead of by scientific name thus in some cases it is difficult to tell what actual species the law designates without other information. The following species appear on one or more state lists of "upland game."

List of game birds
 American Crow
 Band-Tailed Pigeon
 Blue Grouse
 Chukar Partridge
 Dove 
 Dusky Grouse
 Eurasian Collared-Dove
 Gray Partridge
 Greater Sage-Grouse
 Grouse
 Hungarian Partridge
 Mourning Dove
 Partridge
 Pheasant
 Pigeon
 Ptarmigan
 Quail
 Ruffed Grouse
 Sage Grouse
 Sandhill Crane
 Sharp-tailed grouse
 Turkey
 White-tailed ptarmigan
 Wild Turkey
 Woodcock

List of non-avian upland game
 Cottontail rabbit
 Eastern Cottontail Rabbit
 Fox
 Hare
 Opossum
 Prairie Dog
 Rabbit
 Rock Chuck
 Snowshoe Hare
 Tree Squirrel

References

Bibliography 
 
 
 
 
 
 
 
 
 Leigh, W. H. (1940). Preliminary studies on parasites of upland game birds and fur-bearing mammals in Illinois. Illinois Natural History Survey Bulletin; v. 021, no. 05.
 
 
 Shillinger, J. E., & Morley, L. C. (1937). Diseases of upland game birds (No. 1776-1800). US Dept. of Agriculture.
 
 
 Tacha, T. C., & Braun, C. E. (1994). Migratory shore and upland game bird management in North America. The International Association of Fish and Wildlife Agencies.
 
 
 

Bird hunting
Game birds
Hunting in the United States